XHEPF-FM is a radio station broadcasting on 89.1 FM in Ensenada, Baja California, Mexico.

History
Luis Enrique Enciso received the concession for XEPF-AM 1400 on May 16, 1941, and the station signed on four months later. It has remained in the Enciso family ever since. XEPF migrated to FM in 2012, ceasing operations on AM in 2014.

In mid-May 2021, Grupo Audiorama ceased programming XHEPF-FM as "La Bestia Grupera". On June 1, Radio Resultados, another Grupo Radiorama component, took over and moved the Fiesta Mexicana format from XHEBC-FM 97.9. In May 2022, XHEPF and XHEBC relaunched, with XHEPF returning to the La Rancherita name.

References

Radio stations in Ensenada, Baja California
Regional Mexican radio stations
Spanish-language radio stations
Radio stations established in 1941